Limoges Football Club, founded in 1947, were a French association football team based in Limoges, France, last played in the sixth tier of the French football league system. They played at the Stade Saint-Lazare, which can hold 3,000 fans.

The club changed names twice during its existence, being Limoges Football Club at formation, Limoges Foot 87 from 1987 to 2003, and then returning to Limoges Football Club from 2003 until dissolution in 2020. As of 27 January 2020, a proposal exists to reform the club as Limoges Football from the 2020–21 season.

The club played in Division 1 from 1958 to 1961.

History
Limoges Football Club was formed in 1947 through a merger of two rival clubs, Red Star Athlétique de Limoges (founded 1917) and Star Limousin Université Club (founded 1906). In 1957, after playing the majority of their first ten years at the top level of amateur football, they gained professional status, and became part of an expanded French Division 2. They finished third in the table, which gained them promotion to the top division.

The club stayed in French Division 1 for three seasons, with their highest finish being 10th in 1959–60. From relegation in 1961 until 1987, the club competed in Division 2 or Division 3. They came close to promotion back to Division 1 in both 1964 and 1965, qualifying for the playoffs on both occasions. Twice during this period they reached the quarter-final of the Coupe de France, losing after extra time to Stade de Reims in 1962–63 and to Stade Rennais over two legs in 1969–70. At the end of the 1972–73 season they were relegated to Division 3, returning to Division 2 in 1977.

In June 1987, despite a 7th-place finish in Division 2, the leaders of the club declared bankruptcy with a debt of more than five million francs. The club, reborn under the title Limoges Foot 87, were administratively relegated to French Division 4.

From 1987 to 2003, the club played at the fourth and fifth levels of French football. At the end of the 2002–03 season, the club was again forced into bankruptcy, and were administratively relegated to level 6 of the French football league system; Limoges Foot 87 was dissolved, and the reborn club took back the old title of Limoges Football Club.

The club won promotion back to Championnat de France amateur 2 immediately, as champions of the 2003–04 Division d'Honneur Centre-Ouest (Centre-West) group. They spent time at level five and six until 2014 when they successfully won promotion to level 4 from Championnat de France Amateur 2, but were relegated again in 2014–15.

In 2017 the club won promotion to the new fourth level Championnat National 2, but despite finishing 12th in their group in 2017–18 they were relegated administratively back to the fifth level after being placed into administration during the season. At the end of the 2018–19 season they were relegated administratively again to the Regional league due to not being in compliance with the financial rules of the competition.

In January 2020 the club was placed into compulsory liquidation, with the senior men's teams declaring forfeit. The sporting rights of the club were assigned to a new entity, Limoges Football, by the FFF on 24 January 2020, ensuring continuation of junior and women's football at the club. The future of the senior men's teams will be defined at the end of the 2019–20 season.

Notable players
French international players:
Raymond Cicci
Yvon Goujon
Armand Penverne
François Remetter
Paul Sauvage
Laurent Koscielny

Madagascan international players: 
Dimitry Caloin

Managerial history

References

External links
 

 
Association football clubs established in 1947
Association football clubs disestablished in 2020
Defunct football clubs in France
1947 establishments in France
2020 disestablishments in France
Sport in Limoges
Football clubs in Nouvelle-Aquitaine
Ligue 1 clubs